François Bégeot (11 April 1908 – 28 April 1992) was a French long-distance runner. He competed in the marathon at the 1932 Summer Olympics.

References

External links
 

1908 births
1992 deaths
Athletes (track and field) at the 1932 Summer Olympics
French male long-distance runners
French male marathon runners
Olympic athletes of France
Sportspeople from Pas-de-Calais